This article contains a list of notable bassoon makers. The lists are split up according to the two different systems used to construct the bassoon.

Historic
Rottenburgh family, Brussels 18th century

German (Heckel system) Bassoons

 Wilhelm Heckel
 Yamaha
 Fox Products
 W. Schreiber
 Püchner
 Conn-Selmer
 Linton
 Moosmann
 Kohlert
 Moennig/Adler
 B.H. Bell
 Walter
 Stephan Leitzinger
 Guntram Wolf
 Mollenhauer Bassoons

Beginning Bassoons

Several factories in the People's Republic of China produce inexpensive beginner-level instruments that go by the names of these brands.
Laval
Haydn
Lark

Buffet (French) Bassoons

 Buffet Crampon (French system)
 Yannick Ducasse
 AJ musique

See also
Bassoon

References

Bassoons
Bassoon makers